Starman (16 November 1974 – 23 September 2022) was a Mexican professional wrestler who was active as a tecnico in Consejo Mundial de Lucha Libre (CMLL) from 1996. Starman's real name was not a matter of public record, as is often the case with masked wrestlers in Mexico where their private lives are kept a secret from the wrestling fans.

Professional wrestling career
At the beginning he made his debut on 30 April 1994 in Naucalpan as Ultramán Jr. During his time in Naucalpan, he won the mask of Tortuguillo Karateka IV, one of the Ninja Turtles. By 1995 he had his first Japanese tour in July wrestling in Pro Wrestling Fujiwara Gumi. In November 1995, he teamed for the first time with Solar and Super Astro to reform the Cadetes del Espacio. During the early 80s, the original Cadetes (Solar, Super Astro, and the original Ultramán) were a popular high flying team. Shortly thereafter, he started to wrestle for Consejo Mundial de Lucha Libre (CMLL).

Consejo Mundial de Lucha Libre
On 23 January 1996, he made his debut in CMLL teaming with Alacran de Durango and Olimpus defeating Fiero, America, and Linx. Later on he was in a tournament of Block B for the CMLL World Welterweight Championship. In the first round, he lost to Karloff Lagarde, Jr. In October 1998 he changed his name to Starman to avoid legal trouble with the original Ultramán (not a relative). Even since his debut the original had been feuding with him over the rights of the name. He changed his name to Starman after that. He made his first "major show" appearance when he teamed up with Astro Rey, Jr., El Oriental, Tigre Blanco, and Mr. Águila in a losing effort to Zumbido, El Satánico, Valentin Mayo, Virus, and Rencor Latino on the undercard of CMLL's 1999 Ruleta de la Muerte pay-per-view event. On 17 March 2000, he made another major show teaming with Tigre Blanco, Mascara Magica, Astro Rey, Jr., Antifaz, Tony Rivera, Safari, and Olimpico in another losing effort to Arkangel de la Muerte, Dr. O'Borman, Último Guerrero, Zumbido, Rencor Latino, Mr. Mexico, Violencia, and Rey Bucanero On 1 January 2001, he became Ultraman Jr. again to lose his mask to Arkangel de la Muerte in a Japanese card co-promoted by Atsushi Onita. This mask loss was never acknowledged nor even mentioned in his home country.

By 2005, Starman started to wrestle in Japan again this time in New Japan Pro-Wrestling (NJPW). Since his return he had his first match losing to Japanese legend, Tiger Mask. Months later he returned to CMLL wrestling in the undercard.

Luchas de Apuestas record

Notes

References

1974 births
2022 deaths
20th-century professional wrestlers
21st-century professional wrestlers
Masked wrestlers
Mexican male professional wrestlers
Unidentified wrestlers